The 2017 NBA Summer League consisted of three pro basketball leagues organized by the National Basketball Association (NBA): the Orlando Pro Summer League, Utah Jazz Summer League, and Las Vegas Summer League.

Eight teams participated in the week-long Orlando Pro Summer League at Amway Center in Orlando, Florida, from July 1 to 6, 2017. Each team played five games over the course of the week, with a championship day being played on the final day of the league. The Dallas Mavericks and Miami Heat also participated in the Las Vegas Summer League.

Four teams participated in the round-robin format of the Utah Jazz Summer League from July 3 to 6, 2017. All four teams (Utah Jazz, Boston Celtics, Philadelphia 76ers, and San Antonio Spurs) also participated in the Las Vegas Summer League.

The Las Vegas NBA Summer League is the official summer league of the National Basketball Association. It is the premier summer league of the three, with a total of 24 participating. A total of 67 games was played from July 7 to 17, 2017, at the Thomas & Mack Center and Cox Pavilion, both located in Paradise, Nevada (near Las Vegas).

Orlando Pro Summer League
Officially known as the Mountain Dew Orlando Pro Summer League for sponsorship reasons, this 20-game, week-long event will feature eight teams. Each team will play five games over the six-day event, with a championship day being played on the final day of the league. A point system will establish the standings leading up to the final day, with eight points awarded each game based on: four points for winning the game and one point for winning a quarter (in the event of a tied quarter, each team will receive 0.5 points). In the event of ties in seeding heading into championship day, three tiebreakers will be in place: 1) total point differential; 2) total points allowed; 3) coin flip.

Teams
 Orlando Magic (host)
 Charlotte Hornets
 Dallas Mavericks
 Detroit Pistons
 Indiana Pacers
 Miami Heat
 New York Knicks
 Oklahoma City Thunder

Orlando Schedule
All times are in Eastern Daylight Time (UTC–4)

Day 1

Day 2

Day 3

Day 4

Day 5

Championship day
Each team will play one game on the league's final day for either first, third, fifth or seventh place.

Seeding Criteria
The seeding will be determined by a team's total points after the first five days. Eight points will be awarded in each game: four points for winning a game and one point for every quarter a team won. In the event of a tied quarter, each team is awarded half a point. If two or more teams had equal points, then the following tiebreakers applied:
Total point differential
Least total points allowed
Coin flip
Each odd-numbered seed will be paired with the team seeded immediately below it. For example, the top two seeds will play in the championship game, the third and fourth seeds will play in the third-place game, etc.

Standings/seedings

Championship Day Schedule
All times are in Eastern Daylight Time (UTC−4)

Seventh-place game

Fifth-place game

Third-place game

Championship

Final standings

Statistical leaders
Reference: 

Points

Rebounds

Assists

Utah Jazz Summer League
In its now third year, the Utah Jazz Summer League will host four teams. Each team will play each other in a round-robin format for a total of six games, with each team playing each day (July 3, 5, and 6).

Teams
Boston Celtics
Philadelphia 76ers
San Antonio Spurs
Utah Jazz

Utah Schedule
All times are in Mountain Daylight Time (UTC–6)

Day 1

Day 2

Day 3

Final Results

Statistical leaders
Reference: 

Points

Rebounds

Assists

Las Vegas NBA Summer League
The Las Vegas NBA Summer League is the official summer league of the NBA. It is the premier summer league of the three, with a total of 24 teams participating. A total of 67 games were played from July 7 to 17, 2017, at the Thomas & Mack Center and Cox Pavilion, both located in Paradise, Nevada (near Las Vegas). Teams will compete in three preliminary games beginning on July 7 before being seeded in a tournament that leads to the Championship Game on July 17. Each team will play at least five games in Las Vegas.

Teams

Atlanta Hawks
Boston Celtics
Brooklyn Nets
Chicago Bulls
Cleveland Cavaliers
Dallas Mavericks
Denver Nuggets
Golden State Warriors
Houston Rockets
Los Angeles Clippers
Los Angeles Lakers
Memphis Grizzlies
Miami Heat
Milwaukee Bucks
Minnesota Timberwolves
New Orleans Pelicans
Philadelphia 76ers
Phoenix Suns
Portland Trail Blazers
Sacramento Kings
San Antonio Spurs
Toronto Raptors
Utah Jazz
Washington Wizards

Las Vegas Schedule
All times are in Pacific Daylight Time (UTC-7)

Day 1

Day 2

Day 3

Day 4

Day 5

Championship
The championship is determined by a single-elimination tournament; the top 8 teams receive a first-round bye.

Seeding criteria

Teams are seeded first by overall record, then by a tiebreaker system
Head-to-head result (applicable only to ties between two teams, not to multiple-team ties)
Quarter point system (1 point for win, .5 for tie, 0 for loss, 0 for overtime periods)
Point differential
Coin flip

First-round losers will play consolation games to determine 17th through 24th places based on the tiebreaker system stated above. Second-round losers will play consolation games to determine ninth through 16th places.

Standings/seedings

Bracket

Tournament schedule
All times are in Eastern Daylight Time (UTC−4)

First round

Second round

Consolation round

Quarterfinals

Semifinals

Final

Final standings

Statistical leaders
Reference: 

Points

Rebounds

Assists

Honors
The All-Summer League First and Second Teams were selected by a panel of media members in attendance at the Las Vegas NBA Summer League.

All-NBA Summer League First Team
Lonzo Ball, Los Angeles Lakers (2017 Tournament MVP)
John Collins, Atlanta Hawks
Josh Jackson, Phoenix Suns
Dennis Smith Jr., Dallas Mavericks
Caleb Swanigan, Portland Trail Blazers

All-NBA Summer League Second Team
Cheick Diallo, New Orleans Pelicans
Bryn Forbes, San Antonio Spurs
Kyle Kuzma, Los Angeles Lakers
Wayne Selden Jr., Memphis Grizzlies
Jayson Tatum, Boston Celtics

Championship Game MVP: Kyle Kuzma, Los Angeles Lakers

References

External links
Official Site

2017
Summer League
2017–18 in American basketball by league
2017 in sports in Florida
2017 in sports in Nevada
2017 in sports in Utah
July 2017 sports events in the United States